Marek Kowal (born January 24, 1985 in Szczecin) is a Polish footballer who currently plays for Chojniczanka Chojnice.

External links
 

1985 births
Living people
Polish footballers
Ekstraklasa players
Pogoń Szczecin players
Śląsk Wrocław players
Flota Świnoujście players
Sportspeople from Szczecin
Association football forwards